Hahncappsia conisphoralis is a moth in the family Crambidae. It is found in Mexico (Chiapas, Veracruz, Yucatán), Guatemala and Costa Rica.

The wingspan is 22–23 mm for males and 22–26 mm for females. Adults have been recorded on wing from June to November.

References

Moths described in 1967
Pyraustinae